Gaotang is a town of Jiangle County in northwestern Fujian province, China, located  northeast of the county seat as the crow flies. , it has 12 villages under its administration.

See also 
 List of township-level divisions of Fujian

References 

Township-level divisions of Fujian